China Time-honored Brand (Chinese: Zhonghua lao zihao 中华老字号 or simply lao zihao 老字号) is a title granted by the Ministry of Commerce of the People's Republic of China to Chinese enterprises that existed before 1956, sell products, techniques or services passed down through generations, have distinct Chinese cultural characteristics and are widely recognized by society.

This title was first granted soon after the foundation of the PRC in 1949. The current eligibility criteria were set in 2006, when the Ministry of Commerce revised them for the last time.

There are currently around 1,000 brands granted this title, among which are Tongrentang (traditional Chinese medicine), Quanjude (Peking Duck) and Go Believe (baozi or steamed dumpling). Many of the shops have a history of over 400 years, and in modern times have begun to expand via mass commercialization of their products.

Notable Beijing Lao Zihao

Quanjude 全聚德 — Peking duck restaurant 
Donglaishun 东来顺 — hotpot restaurant 
Douyichu 都一处 — restaurant famous for its shaomai 
Bianyifang 便宜坊 — another Peking duck restaurant 
Goubuli 狗不理 — baozi restaurant (founded in Tianjin, a city near Beijing) 
Hundun hou 馄饨侯 — wonton (hundun) restaurant 
Liubiju 六必居 — sells preserved vegetables and sauces 
Rongbaozhai 荣宝斋 — sells works of art (notably wall scrolls) 
Tongrentang 同仁堂 — supplier of medicinal herbs used in Traditional Chinese Medicine 
Zhang Yiyuan 张一元 — teahouse 
Ruifuxiang 瑞蚨祥 — silk clothing and qipaos 
Neiliansheng 内联升 — old Chinese cloth shoes 
Shengxifu 盛锡福 — hats

References

Works cited

See also 

 Economy of China
 Economic history of China (Pre-1911)
 Economic history of China (1912–1949)

Trade and industrial classification systems
Chinese culture
Chinese brands
Culture in Beijing
Economic history of China